Springfield School District No. 186, known as Springfield Public Schools (SPS), is a unit school district in Sangamon County, Illinois.  Its territory includes most of the city of Springfield, Illinois, its four inner suburbs of Grandview, Leland Grove, Jerome, and Southern View, and some rural areas immediately north of Springfield. Some of Springfield's newest and most affluent neighborhoods lie outside the district.

History 
The school system was formed in 1854 by state statute, granting the city of Springfield a school charter with power exercised by the Springfield city council.  In 1869 the charter was amended to devolve power to a nine-person school board appointed by the city council.  As a result of Springfield having over 35,000 population in the 1910 Census, state law caused the nine-person board to be replaced with a seven-person board of education elected by the public, starting in April 1911.

During the turn of the century, the district had operated a teachers training school for 32 years.

Statistics
District 186 operates 23 elementary schools, 7 middle schools, 3 high schools, and 4 additional schools for alternative or adult education. Total enrollment in 2019 was 14,063 students, down from 15,048 in 2015. The district employs 1,020 teachers.

References

External links
 
 Illinois Report Card for District 186

Education in Springfield, Illinois
School districts in Illinois
School districts established in 1854
1854 establishments in Illinois